Sphaeronassa is a genus of sea snails, marine gastropod mollusks in the family Nassariidae, the Nassa mud snails or dog whelks.

The genus Sphaeronassa has become a synonym of Nassarius Duméril, 1805

Species
Species within the genus Sphaeronassa include:
 Sphaeronassa mutabilis (Linnaeus, 1758): synonym of Nassarius mutabilis (Linnaeus, 1758)

References

External links
  Locard A. (1886). Prodrome de malacologie française. Catalogue général des mollusques vivants de France. Mollusque marins. Lyon, H. Georg & Paris, Baillière : pp. X + 778

Nassariidae
Monotypic gastropod genera